David John Angelo Trotman (born 27 September 1951) is a mathematician, with dual British and French nationality. He is a grandson of the poet and author Oliver W F Lodge and a great-grandson of the physicist Sir Oliver Lodge. He works in an area of singularity theory known as the theory of stratifications, and particularly on properties of stratifications satisfying the Whitney conditions and other similar conditions (due to René Thom, Tzee-Char Kuo, Jean-Louis Verdier, Trotman himself, Karim Bekka and others) important for understanding topological stability.

At the age of 16, with Philip Crabtree, he was awarded the Explorer Belt in Izmir, Turkey.

Trotman was educated at King Edward's School in Stourbridge, before entering St. John's College, Cambridge in 1969, where he won the John Couch Adams Essay Prize in 1971 for an essay on plane algebraic curves. He carried out doctoral work at the University of Warwick, and the University of Paris-Sud in Orsay.  His thesis, entitled Whitney Stratifications: Faults and Detectors, was directed by Christopher Zeeman and C. T. C. Wall while at Warwick, and Bernard Teissier and René Thom while at Orsay.

After positions at the University of Paris-Sud and the University of Angers, since 1988 Trotman has been Professor of Mathematics at the University of Provence in Marseille, France, now called Aix-Marseille University. He has held visiting positions at Cornell University, the University of Hawaii, the Isaac Newton Institute of the University of Cambridge, the Mathematical Sciences Research Institute in Berkeley, California, and the Fields Institute in Toronto, Canada.

Trotman has directed eleven PhD theses. Among his research students are Patrice Orro, Karim Bekka, Claudio Murolo, Georges Comte, Dwi Juniati and Guillaume Valette.

Trotman was Director of the Graduate School in Mathematics and Computing of Marseilles from 1996 to 2004, and was an elected member of the CNU (the French National University Council) from 1999 until 2007.

References

External links
David Trotman's homepage
Publications at MathSciNet

Scientists from Plymouth, Devon
English emigrants to France
Alumni of St John's College, Cambridge
Alumni of the University of Warwick
University of Paris alumni
Academic staff of Paris-Sud University
Academic staff of the University of Angers
Academic staff of the University of Provence
Cornell University faculty
University of Hawaiʻi faculty
20th-century British mathematicians
21st-century British mathematicians
1951 births
Living people
People educated at King Edward VI College, Stourbridge